Eric García Martret (born 9 January 2001) is a Spanish professional footballer who plays as a centre-back for La Liga club Barcelona and the Spain national team.

García moved from Barcelona at the age of 17 to Manchester City. He made his Premier League debut on 21 September 2019. In his final season at the club, he won the league and was runner-up in the UEFA Champions League. In June 2021, Garcia rejoined Barcelona on a free transfer, following the expiration of his contract.

Club career

Early career
Born in Martorell, Barcelona, Catalonia, García was a part of La Masia, the Barcelona academy, before joining Manchester City in 2017. During his first season at City, he captained the under 18s and played for the under 19s in the UEFA Youth League.

Manchester City
He joined up with the first team during their 2018 summer pre-season in the United States. On 18 December 2018, García made his debut for City, starting in the EFL Cup quarter-final against Leicester City. He played in a centre-back pairing with Nicolás Otamendi, with the game finishing 1–1, City winning the tie on penalties. He made his Premier League debut on 21 September 2019 when he came on as a 63rd-minute substitute for Otamendi in an 8–0 win over Watford.

García played two full games back to back for City over the Christmas and New Year period in 2019. The first game was against Sheffield United at home, which City won 2–0. A second home game in a couple of days, saw a second start for García, with City recording a 2–1 victory against Everton.

On 17 June 2020, García was in the starting eleven against Arsenal for City's first game back after the COVID-19 pandemic break, with City recording a 3–0 win. Towards the end of the game, García was involved in a collision with goalkeeper Ederson and initially left him unconscious. García received lengthy on-field treatment before being stretchered off and supplied with oxygen. Despite the seriousness of the incident, García was discharged from hospital the next day. Manager Pep Guardiola stated in a press conference García's injury was a concussion and expected him to be fit within 10 days.

On 6 August 2020, Guardiola announced in a press conference that García had rejected a contract extension, despite ending the league campaign as City's first-choice partner for Aymeric Laporte.

Return to Barcelona
On 1 June 2021, García agreed to sign for La Liga club Barcelona on a free transfer on a five-year contract starting 1 July, with a buyout clause set at €400 million. On 15 August 2021, he played his first competitive match for the club as he started the league opening game, a 4–2 victory against Real Sociedad. On 21 August, he was sent off after receiving a straight red card for his last-ditch tackle on Nico Williams in a 1–1 draw against Athletic Bilbao. On 29 September, García was sent off for the second time after receiving two yellow cards in a 3–0 Champions League group stage thrashing by Benfica.

International career
After representing Spain at under-19 and under-21 levels, García received his first senior call-up on 20 August 2020, for two UEFA Nations League fixtures against Germany and Ukraine. He made his senior international debut against Ukraine on 6 September 2020, replacing Sergio Ramos in the 61st minute as Spain won 4–0. On 24 May 2021, García was included in Luis Enrique's 24-man squad for UEFA Euro 2020. Additionally, García was included in the squad for the 2020 Summer Olympics in Tokyo.

Career statistics

Club

International

Honours
Manchester City
Premier League: 2020–21
EFL Cup: 2019–20
FA Community Shield: 2019
UEFA Champions League runner-up: 2020–21

Barcelona
Supercopa de España: 2022–23

Spain U17
UEFA European Under-17 Championship: 2017
FIFA U-17 World Cup runner-up: 2017

Spain U19
UEFA European Under-19 Championship: 2019

Spain U23
Summer Olympic silver medal: 2020

Spain
UEFA Nations League runner-up: 2020–21

Individual
UEFA European Under-19 Championship Team of the Tournament: 2019
IFFHS Men's Youth (U20) World Team: 2021
IFFHS Men's Youth (U20) UEFA Team: 2020, 2021

References
For Spain U19 and U21 infobox statistics

Specific

External links

Profile at the FC Barcelona website

2001 births
Living people
Footballers from Barcelona
Spanish footballers
Spain youth international footballers
Spain under-21 international footballers
Spain international footballers
Association football defenders
Manchester City F.C. players
FC Barcelona players
Premier League players
La Liga players
UEFA Euro 2020 players
Footballers at the 2020 Summer Olympics
2022 FIFA World Cup players
Spanish expatriate footballers
Expatriate footballers in England
Spanish expatriate sportspeople in England
Olympic footballers of Spain
Olympic medalists in football
Olympic silver medalists for Spain
Medalists at the 2020 Summer Olympics